Vuelamex S.A de CV was a Mexican airline. It was planned as a low-cost (LCC) operator, but it never started operations.

History
Vuelamex was established in 2002 by Captain Alberto Abed Schekaiban, a former owner of TAESA, to operate as low-fare airline, with services operating from Mexico City and Toluca. The airline planned to start operations on April 30, 2002. Its first acquired plane was a Boeing 717, which was painted with the airline's livery and lacked only the authorization by the DGAC, but due to the DGAC treating it as the same situation of TAESA, it did not authorize the airline to operate, and the project was cancelled. FlyMex is considered Vuelamex's successor.

Destinations
 Federal District:
 Mexico City
 Mexico State:
 Toluca

Fleet
 1 Boeing 717-200
After of the airline shut down, the 717 was transferred to AirTran.

References

External links
 Vuelamex at JetPhotos.net
 Vuelamex at Airliners.net

Defunct airlines of Mexico
Airlines established in 2002
Airlines disestablished in 2002
Defunct low-cost airlines
2002 disestablishments in Mexico
Mexican companies established in 2002